Walter Gwynne Evans (1867 – 10 May 1897) was a Welsh footballer who played as a full-back for English clubs, Bootle and Aston Villa in the 1890s. With Villa, he was on the losing side in the 1892 FA Cup Final. He made three appearances for Wales against England, each of which was a defeat.

Football career
Evans was born in Builth, Brecknockshire, the son of the local butcher. As a youth, he excelled at many sports including cricket, rugby and soccer. Having started his career with his local club, he moved to England in 1889 when he joined Bootle; Evans made four appearances for Bootle in the 1889–90 Football Alliance season at the end of which Bootle finished as runners-up.

Evans made his international debut while still a Bootle player when he was called up for the British Home Championship match against England played at Wrexham's Racecourse Ground on 15 March 1890. England were scheduled to play two international matches on the same day and fielded their strongest side against Wales with a slightly weaker team going to Belfast to play Ireland; England won both matches, with Edmund Currey scoring twice on his debut and Tinsley Lindley continuing his run of goals in a 3–0 victory over Wales.

In July 1890, Evans joined Aston Villa where he became a regular member of the team. He made a total of 23 appearances in 1891–92 and 28 in the following year helping Villa to reach the FA Cup Final against local rivals, West Bromwich Albion. Despite being favourites going into the game, Villa lost 3–0 with Albion's goals coming from Geddes, Nicholls and Reynolds.

Evans made two further international appearances, both against England, with a 4–1 defeat in March 1891 and a 2–0 defeat a year later. In his 1891 assessment by the Football Association of Wales, Evans was described as "a very good back, tackles unflinchingly and a safe kick; (has) done himself credit".

Evans remained with Villa for a further season before returning to Builth in August 1893. He continued to turn out for Builth until his death in 1897.

International appearances
Evans made three appearances for Wales as follows:

Non-football career
On returning to Builth, Evans became landlord of the Lamb Inn. This public house became the headquarters and changing rooms of the Builth Football Club.

In May 1897, Evans caught a chill while attending a funeral and died within a few days. His death was described as "a calamity for the Builth club".

Honours
Aston Villa
FA Cup finalists: 1892

References

External links

Lamb Inn website

1867 births
1897 deaths
People from Builth Wells
Sportspeople from Powys
Welsh footballers
Association football defenders
Bootle F.C. (1879) players
Aston Villa F.C. players
Wales international footballers
FA Cup Final players